Henrik Roardsen Spangelo (1858–1926) was a Norwegian politician for the Conservative Party and later the Liberal Left Party.

A jurist by education, he worked as a civil servant in Grimstad and Arendal. At the same time he speculated in estate in his native Årdal, such as the Tyin waterfall in Øvre Årdal.

He served as a deputy representative to the Norwegian Parliament from the constituency Arendal og Grimstad during the terms 1906–1909 and 1910–1912. He then served as a regular representative during the terms 1913–1915, 1919–1921 and 1922–1924. From 1919 to 1924 he was President of the Odelsting.

References
Henrik Spangelo at NRK Sogn og Fjordane County Encyclopedia 

1858 births
1926 deaths
Members of the Storting
Conservative Party (Norway) politicians
Free-minded Liberal Party politicians
20th-century Norwegian politicians
Aust-Agder politicians
Mayors of places in Sogn og Fjordane
People from Årdal